The Haskell organ pipe construction, sometimes known as "Haskelling" is a method of organ construction used when space does not permit the builder to build a full-length pipe. It consists of a shorter (compared to the full-length pipe) tube nested within another shorter tube. This construction, however, subtly alters the tone of the pipe, causing it to adopt a slightly string-like tone.  The minimum height of a 16-foot pipe using this technique is around 10 feet.

History
This technique was developed and patented by the William E. Haskell in 1910, in a series of patents Haskell took out on techniques intended to reduce the length of organ pipes while maintaining their pitch. Haskell creates several variations on this design.

Uses
This technique is far more commonly used on flue pipes than reed pipes.

References

Pipe organ